Sergei Yuryevich Volkov (born 27 September 1980) is a former Russian football striker.

Club career
He made his Russian Premier League debut for FC Amkar Perm on 13 March 2004 in a game against FC Kuban Krasnodar.

Career statistics

External links

Profile on Official FC Amkar Website 
 

Living people
1980 births
Sportspeople from Kaluga
Russian footballers
FC Amkar Perm players
Russian Premier League players
FC Lokomotiv Kaluga players
Association football forwards